Frederick Hudson may refer to:
 Frederick Hudson (cricketer)
 Frederick Hudson (photographer)
 Frederick Mitchell Hudson, lawyer and politician in Florida

See also
 Frederic Hudson, American newspaper editor
 Frederic M. Hudson, American philosopher, educator and writer
 Fred Hudson (Fredrick A. Hudson), Canadian ice hockey manager